Roger Carter Jr. (born March 31, 1999) is an American football tight end who is a free agent. He played college football at Georgia State.

College career
Carter was a four-year starter, five-year letterwinner, and Three-time All-Sun Belt Conference selection for the Panthers as a tight end. He finished his campaign as Georgia State’s career leader in receptions and receiving yards by a tight end. Carter Finished ninth in GSU history in receptions, eighth in receiving yards and tied for sixth with 12 touchdowns. He amassed 96 receptions for 1,224 yards and 12 touchdowns during his collegiate career. He was a part of the Georgia State program's first-ever bowl game win in the 2017 Cure Bowl.

Professional career

Carter Jr. signed with the Los Angeles Rams as an undrafted free agent in 2022. During final roster cuts on August 30, Carter Jr. was released, but signed to the practice squad the next day. On September 26, Carter Jr. was elevated to the active roster. He made his debut the following day playing 12 snaps. He signed a reserve/futures contract on January 9, 2023.

On March 10, 2023, Carter was waived by the Los Angeles Rams.

External links
Los Angeles Rams bio
Georgia State Panthers bio

References 

1999 births
Living people
American players of American football
Los Angeles Rams players
Georgia State Panthers athletes
Georgia State University alumni